The Northern Arizona Lumberjacks men's ice hockey team is a college ice hockey program that represents Northern Arizona University. They are a member of the American Collegiate Hockey Association at the Division II and Division III levels and are former members of the Pacific Collegiate Hockey Association and West Coast Hockey Conference. The university sponsored NCAA Division I ice hockey from 1981–1986.

History
NAU founded its ice hockey program in 1971 after the completion of the Flagstaff Ice Rink. With the popularity of the club increasing, the team moved into the much larger Walkup Skydome in 1977 and, with continued interest, the university began sponsoring the program as a Division I sport in 1981. Northern Arizona was handicapped with a difficult travel schedule but the school was still supportive of their fledgling program and the Lumberjacks made strides, improving by 11 wins in their second year. Head coach Jimmy Peters Jr. got the team up to 21 wins before leaving the program in 1984 and was replaced by John Mason. In 1985 Northern Arizona joined with Alaska–Anchorage, Alaska–Fairbanks and U.S. International to form the Great West Hockey Conference. NAU finished 3rd in the conference but had several problems: the Walkup Skydome was in need of serious and expensive repair, the state had cut the University's budget for the next fiscal cycle and NAU was required to meet Title IX guidelines. With all of those issues the University suspended the program and ended the Lumberjacks time in D-I hockey.

After several years of nonexistence the program was brought back in 1991 as a club sport and returned to the Flagstaff Ice Rink (since renamed the Jay Lively Activity Center) where it continues as two separate ACHA teams.

Season-by-season results
Source:

Footnotes

Lumberjacks in the NHL

References

 
1971 establishments in Arizona
Ice hockey clubs established in 1971